Guihomar II de Léon (died in 1103) was a Viscount of Léon. He is said to have succeeded his grandfather Guihomar I.

Origins 
Guihomar is said to be the son of a man named Ehuarn. But according to Joëlle Quaghebeur, this Ehuarn was actually a "Viscount from Cornouaille", that is to say a Viscount of Le Faou. It seems that Guihomar II succeeded his supposed grandfather and namesake Guihomar I.

A charter of the Cartulary of Saint-Georges de Rennes also mentions a Guihomar, son of Alan, himself named son of Guihomar in another charter in the same cartulary.

Guihomar might then be the son of Ehuarn and a daughter or a granddaughter of Guihomar I.

Guihomar's death is mentioned in the Chronicon Britannicum. It is specified that Guihomar II was killed in 1103 by his own subjects.

Possible family tree 
                Alan [I] of Léon
                │
                ├──> Guihomar I of Léon († after 1040)
                │    │
                │    ├──> Alan [II] († after 1060)
                │    │    │
                │    │    ├──> Guyomar († after 1050, before his father)
                │    │    │
                │    │    ├──> a daughter
                │    │    │    x Ehuarn, viscount of Cornouaille
                │    │    │    │
                │    │    │    └──> Guihomar II
                │    │    │
                │    │    └──> Emma/Anna
                │    │         x Odo I, Viscount of Porhoët
                │    └──> Alfred († after 1060)
                │
                └──> Alfred of Léon, Lord of Mordelles († after 1028)

Issue 
Guihomar II married Orven of Cornouaille. They may have had two children:
 Harvey who succeeded his father.

Harvey also had an illegitimate son with an unknown woman:
 Harvey.

In literary works 
Guihomar III of Léon may have inspired Guigemar, the hero of the Lai Guigemar by Marie de France: the story takes place in Brittany at the time of Hoilas (maybe Duke Hoël II); one of Hoilas' barons, Lord of Liun (Léon) has a daughter, Noguent, and a son, Guigemar (Guihomar).

References

Sources 
 Patrick Kernévez, André-Yves Bourgès. Généalogie des vicomtes de Léon (XIe, XIIe et XIIIe siècles). Bulletin de la Société archéologique du Finistère, volume CXXXVI, 2007, p. 157-188.

Viscounts of Léon
House of Léon
1103 deaths